Martha Silvana Montaner Formoso (6 January 1955 – 9 March 2016) was a Uruguayan politician of the Colorado Party.

Biography
Martha Montaner was the daughter of Dora Formoso and the  politician . First he and then she led the group of list 2215 in Tacuarembó Department. Martha studied dentistry and specialized in pediatric dentistry.

She joined the so-called "women's caucus", seeking the promotion of political participation and the rights of women, along with fellow deputies Beatriz Argimón, Raquel Barreiro, Nora Castro, Silvana Charlone, Margarita Percovich, Yeanneth Puñales, María Alejandra Rivero Saralegui, Glenda Rondán, Diana Saravia Olmos, Lucía Topolansky, and Daisy Tourné.

On several occasions she was a candidate for the Departmental Intendance of Tacuarembó.

In 2008 Montaner disassociated herself from the Foro Batllista, due to a disagreement over the way it chose candidates. In 2009 she joined the movement Vamos Uruguay, led by Pedro Bordaberry. She was elected deputy for the period 2010-2015. During that term, she was also a substitute for Ope Pasquet in the Senate.

She held a place on the National Executive Committee (CEN) of the Colorado Party. On 8 March 2012, she became the party's Secretary General. This made her the first woman in Uruguayan history to occupy the top position of representation in a political party.

In the 2014 elections she won a seat in the Senate of the Republic, a position she held from 15 February 2015 until her death.

Martha Montaner died on 9 March 2016 at the age of 61, from cancer.

References

1955 births
2016 deaths
Colorado Party (Uruguay) politicians
Deaths from cancer in Uruguay
Members of the Chamber of Representatives of Uruguay
Members of the Senate of Uruguay
People from Tacuarembó
University of the Republic (Uruguay) alumni
Uruguayan dentists
Uruguayan people of Catalan descent
21st-century Uruguayan women politicians
21st-century Uruguayan politicians
Women dentists
20th-century dentists